Penrose railway station is located on the Main South line in New South Wales, Australia. It serves the village of Penrose opening in 1869 as Cables Siding being renamed Penrose on 1 June 1871. It was relocated to its present site on 15 March 1916.

Platforms & services
Penrose has two side platforms. It is serviced by early morning and evening NSW TrainLink Southern Highlands Line services travelling between Sydney Central, Campbelltown, Moss Vale and Goulburn.

During the day it is served by one NSW TrainLink road coach service in each direction between Moss Vale and Goulburn.

References

External links

Penrose station details Transport for New South Wales

Railway stations in Australia opened in 1869
Railway stations in Australia opened in 1916
Regional railway stations in New South Wales
Short-platform railway stations in New South Wales, 2 cars
Main Southern railway line, New South Wales
Southern Highlands (New South Wales)